The Post Falls Community United Presbyterian Church is a historic Presbyterian church in Post Falls, Idaho.  It was added to the National Register of Historic Places in 1984.

It was assembled in 1921 from the combination of two former churches that would move to the site from other Post Falls locations.  The former Post Falls Methodist Episcopal Church building has served as the sanctuary and the former Post Falls First Presbyterian Church building has served as a Christian education wing.

References

Presbyterian churches in Idaho
Churches on the National Register of Historic Places in Idaho
Churches completed in 1890
Buildings and structures in Kootenai County, Idaho
Post Falls, Idaho
National Register of Historic Places in Kootenai County, Idaho